Scot is a masculine given name. Notable people with the name include:

 Scot Brantley (born 1958), American football linebacker
 Scot Breithaupt (born 1957), American cyclist
 Scot Coogan (born 1971), American rock drummer
 Scot D. Ryersson (born 1960), American writer
 Scot Dapp (born 1952), American football coach
 Scot Davis (21st century), American wrestler
 Scot Eaton (21st century), American comic book artist
 Scot Gemmill (born 1971), Scottish professional football player
 Scot Halpin (1954–2008), American drummer
 Scot Hollonbeck (21st century), American wheelchair racer
 Scot Kelsh (born 1962), American politician
 Scot Kleinendorst (1960–2019), American ice hockey defenseman
 Scot McCloughan (21st century), American football executive
 Scot McKnight (21st century), American theologian
 Scot Mendelson (born 1969), American powerlifter
 Scot Palmer (21st century), Australian sports journalist
 Scot Pollard (born 1975), American professional basketball player
 Scot Rubin (21st century), American television talk show host
 Scot Schmidt (born 1961), American alpine skier
 Scot Shields (born 1975), American baseball player
 Scot Sloan, a Doonesbury character
 Scot Symon (1911–1985), Scottish football player
 Scot Thompson (born 1981), American soccer player
 Scot Walters (21st century), American racecar driver
 Scot Williams (born 1972), English actor
 Wayne Scot Lukas (21st century), American fashion consultant

See also
 Scott (name)
 Scut (disambiguation)

Masculine given names